Voiceworks is a national quarterly print magazine based in Melbourne, Victoria, featuring work by Australian writers and artists under the age of 25.

Production
The magazine is produced by the editor together with a designer, an intern and a volunteer editorial committee (EdComm), all of whom are also under twenty-five. This committee assists the editor in reading submissions, editing content, proofreading, running launches, and writing feedback for all contributors.

From around issue 12 onwards (there is no complete archive), Voiceworks began to be published as a quarterly, 80-page magazine. Then, from issue 98 onwards the format changed to its current smaller, 128-page format. It has now published more than 100 issues. The magazine is based in Melbourne with the Wheeler Centre, an initiative of the Government of Victoria as part of Melbourne’s designation by UNESCO as a City of Literature in 2008.

Each issue is subtitled according to a theme determined by the editorial committee a number of issues advance. A theme blurb is written by the EdComm and distributed with calls for submissions, with potential contributors encouraged to contribute themed work.

Publisher
Its publisher, Express Media, a non-profit media organisation for young artists, was established in 1983 as Express Media Power Workshops. Its newsletter Voiceworks was launched by the then prime minister, Bob Hawke and music journalist Molly Meldrum in 1985 for International Youth Year, to promote the organisation's program of workshops. Since then, Express Media's operations and projects have been financed by grants from the Federal and state government arts funding bodies Australia Council for the Arts and Arts Victoria, from the writer John Marsden and from the private philanthropic fund Copyright Agency Ltd. Marsden is Express Media's patron, and a contributor of operational funding as well as prize money for the John Marsden Prize for Young Australian Writers.

See also
List of literary magazines

References

External links
 Express Media

1985 establishments in Australia
Magazines established in 1985
Magazines published in Melbourne
Literary magazines published in Australia
Quarterly magazines published in Australia